Blast a Moscow-based band formed in the late 1990s by Georgian singer/songwriter Nash Tavkhelidze.
	
He had previously spent a number of years in the US playing in different bands . In states he met Georgian musician Gia Iashvili they did few successful shows together and realised that it was great collaboration ! But unfortunately Nash had to return to Moscow because of family issues. While being in Moscow he decided to put the band together. Gia Iashvili also flew back and joined the band together with their old friend Alexandre Hlup Yarchevsky and the drummer Igor Meshkovsky . They decided to call the band Blast. The unit came out very productive and within two-month Nash Gia and Khlap completed their album "Pigs Can Fly" which was produced by talented producer from Manchester Mark Tolle At that time the Moscow club scene was booming and BLAST very quickly became the most popular indie band in the city. In 1998 band was picked up by the indie label "Apollo G Records" (Manchester, UK). They released their first album "Pigs Can Fly" and followed this with a UK club tour in 2000. In 2000 Gia and the drummer left the band and two musicians from Bulgaria Vlado Kostov and Valio blagoev ( drums & bass) joined BLAST. Few years later the band signed to Ghost Records UK and hit the studio recording the album F**K the industry with producer Graham Pilgrim. Ghost Records Musical Director Frank Perri and A&R manager Phillipe Palmer drew much attention to the Russian Rock Rebels and a place within the British music scene was forged. Regular tours of the UK and Europe have continued since that time.

Cookies are Sweet

At that time, the Russian music industry paid little attention to home grown bands singing in English, yet despite this in 2000 Russian MTV regularly rotated the video of the BLAST track "Cookies are Sweet", taken from their first album. Encouraged by this, BLAST undertook a tour of Russia, generating associated album sales.

OPPI-KOPPI International Festival

In 2001 the band was invited to South Africa to participate in the OPPI-KOPPI International Festival in Pretoria, followed by a tour of South Africa.  They were the first band from the ex- Soviet Union to take part in this international event. During this tour BLAST began recording their second album Bury The Shoe-Girl which was finished in 2002 and released by the London Label Ghost Records. A video of the track Girlfriend was rotated on Russian MTV. "Bury the Shoe Girl" was produced in Manchester by Mark Tolle (Stone Roses and The Mock Turtles). Release of the album was also supported by a UK club tour and the Bury the Shoe-Girl received exposure in the UK on "Radio 1" and "Ex.Fm" London. The UK tour was followed by tours of Russia and Europe, generating healthy album sales.

2003-2004
The band spent most of 2003 and 2004 touring, playing festivals in Russia, Europe and the UK, and gigging in Moscow. In 2003 they were chosen by the UK band "Blur" to support them for one show in Moscow. They also supported numerous other acts including "Razorlight", "Thirteen Senses", and "Franz Ferdinand".

F**k the Industry

In 2005 Blast released their third album "F**k the Industry". The album was recorded in South London by producer Graham Pilgrim through Ghost Records UK who signed the band after their spell with Apollo G. It was the band's second release with the London Label. Two songs from this album, "Alright" and "Get Off Your Trip" were successfully rotated on Russia's first alternative radio station "Radio Maximum". This was the first time the band released an album on a Russian label ("Nikitin Records") and resulted in healthy sales in the Russian Federation. Following the release of the album the band undertook a 23 gig UK club tour commencing in Glasgow and finished in Brighton in a one-month period. "Radio 1" DJ Steve Lamaque also presented a whole show dedicated to the Blast tour and the album "F**k the Industry".

Misha Gallagher

After the release of "F**k the Industry" Khlap left the band, and was replaced by Misha Gallagher on guitar. Also in 2005 Blast began presenting their own big rock'n'roll nights in Moscow called "BLAST Night". These are held in Moscow's most popular rock'n'roll club "Krizis Zhanra" which was founded by Blast and their friends. These weekly nights have established Krizis Zhanra as the de facto venue for Indie Rock music in Russia, and have given Russian audiences the opportunity to hear English language music from bands both from Russia and elsewhere in the world (particularly the UK). The success of these nights have continued, with recently featured bands including "The Milk", "Look See Proof'", "The Rifles" and "All Tomorrow's Parties".

Blastfest

The success of this enterprise inspired the band to raise the level, and in 2008 they held a large international festival "Blastfest" in Moscow. Performers included indie bands from all over the USSR, and the headliners were "Supergrass" and Brett Anderson from the UK. This was a major success for the Russian music scene that year and was attended by 5000-6000 people. "NME" covered the festival and called Blast the Godfathers of the Russian indie rock scene. In 2007 Blast released their fourth album "Real Life". The song "Wherever you Go" taken from the album became a massive hit among Russian rock'n'roll audiences.

Seva Stebletsov

In 2009 Seva Stebletsov joined the band on keyboards. They then released their fifth album "Strange Days Coming" on the Russian label Navigator Records. This proved to be the most successful release for the band to date. The release of the album was followed by three club tours, two in the UK and one in Europe.

Overplay.com
In June 2010 The Blast became the No. 1 in UK internet indie charts "Overplay.com". They then released the 5-track EP "Papillon", followed by a UK tour of 9 gigs in 14 days during July, including 2 festivals in Bristol and Birmingham. They also played the one-day 'Creation of Peace' festival in Kazan, Russia, which comprised worldwide artists and was attended by over 150,000.
 
The band is currently working on their sixth album.

Krisis of Genre
In August 2013 Blast Unit Moscow release "Rollercoaster Ride" the first single from their new album "Krisis of Genre".

References

 
 			

Russian musical groups
Musical groups from Moscow